Vineet Soni, the son of noted botanist Professor P.L. Swarnkar, is a plant physiologist and the founder of the "Save Guggul Movement", a community-based conservation effort to conserve threatened plant species, particularly guggul. His conservation efforts were well received by local villagers and conservation communities from all over the world. Soni was profiled as one of 20 global "Earth Movers" by IUCN. Initially his conservation work received financial support from the IUCN Sir Peter Scott Fund. He is currently working as associate professor at the Department of Botany, Mohanlal Sukhadia University, Udaipur.

Education and Professional Career
Vineet was born on 21 May 1979 at Maharaj Ki Khedi village near Udaipur, Rajasthan. He specializes in plant physiology, conservation biology, and photosynthesis research. He received  bachelor's (1996–99) from Maharaja College, Jaipur and master's degree (2000-2001) in Botany from the University of Rajasthan, Jaipur. He then joined the Birla Institute of Scientific Research and University of Rajasthan for doctoral research (PhD) work on various aspects of biotechnology and physiology of Commiphora wightii. In 2004, Soni received visiting fellowship to work on plant bioenergetics at University of Geneva, Switzerland. Through the Bio-Rad fellowship, he visited European Molecular Biology Laboratory at Heidelberg, Germany in 2005. Thereafter in 2006, Soni received prestigious award from Nature Publishing Group to present his research work at Gordon Conference at Boston, USA.

After receiving PhD degree, Soni worked as Post-Doctoral research fellow with Professor Reto J. Strasser at University of Geneva, Switzerland. In 2010, UNESCO, France published his special interview entitled 'Why Vineet Soni is bent on saving the guggul plants?' in 'A World of Science' journal. In 2011, he served as a visiting scientist at the Commissariat à l'énergie atomique et aux énergies alternatives, France. He is a member of three International Union for Conservation of Nature commissions: the Species Survival Commission, the World Commission for Protected Areas, and the Commission on Education and Communication and elected fellow of many prestigious societies i.e. the Academy of Plant Sciences of India, Mendelian Society of India, Indian Botanical Society, Indian Council for Plant Conservation and Linnean Society of London.

Publications and Notable Awards
Dr. Soni has published several research papers in journals of reputes such as Nature Research-Scientific Reports, Physiologia Plantarum, Conservation Evidence, South African Journal of Botany, Biochemical and Biophysical Research Communications etc and has been honored with Scientist of the Year Award, Outstanding Scientist Award, Nature Publishing Group Award, Bio-Rad Award, Innovation in Teaching Award, Earth Mover Award etc.

References 

Living people
20th-century Indian botanists
Indian environmentalists
Scientists from Jaipur
1979 births
University of Rajasthan alumni
University of Geneva alumni
Academic staff of Mohanlal Sukhadia University